Monjiviricetes is a class of negative-strand RNA viruses which infect fungi, plants, invertebrates, and vertebrates. The name is a portmanteau of the two orders within the class, Mononegavirales and Jingchuvirales and the suffix for a virus class -viricetes.

Taxonomy

References

Negarnaviricota
Virus classes